The 1998 San Miguel Beermen season was the 24th season of the franchise in the Philippine Basketball Association (PBA).

Draft picks

Notable dates
February 1: San Miguel Beermen got excellent debuts from its two rookies Danny Ildefonso and Steve Smith as the Beermen pulled away with an 86-67 rout of Pop Cola at the start of the All-Filipino Cup. 

April 14: San Miguel booked the first finals seat in the All-Filipino Cup with their 14th win against six losses, defeating Pop Cola, 89-69.

Summary
After two seasons of non-finals appearance, the San Miguel Beermen return to the championship series twice in the season but could only end up with a runner-up finishes. The Beermen placed second behind Alaska Milkmen in the eliminations of the All-Filipino Cup with seven wins and four losses.  They won eight games in the semifinals for a league-best 15-6 won-loss record. The Beermen played the Alaska Milkmen in the best-of-seven championship. In the battle between two American coaches, Ron Jacobs and Alaska's Tim Cone, the Beermen blew a 3-2 series advantage, they lost Game six by a big margin and in the deciding seventh game on May 8, the San Miguel Beermen folded up to the pressure as the game reaches its climax, losing by nine points to Alaska Milkmen, 63-72, before a jampacked crowd at the Araneta Coliseum.

In the Commissioner's Cup, the Beermen bring back last year's best import Jeff Ward, who was good for only six games when coach Ron Jacobs gambled on a smaller import in the returning Lamont Strothers. The Beermen scored a 3-0 sweep over Pop Cola in the best-of-five semifinal series and went on to play the Alaska Milkmen in a championship rematch. The Milkmen paraded a taller import Devin Davis and they jump off to a 2-0 series lead in the best-of-seven finals, the Beermen were able to tie the series at two games apiece by winning Games three and four, but Alaska came back with a victory in Game five and finish off the Beermen in six games. 

Lamont Strothers teamed up with last year's Governors Cup best import Larry Robinson in the last two conferences of the season. The Beermen's bid for a third straight finals appearance was halted by Formula Shell, which beat the Beermen, 87-83, in one of the two knockout matches for a finals berth on November 22.

Roster

Transactions

Trades

Additions

Recruited imports

References

San Miguel Beermen seasons
San